Sturston could be

Sturston, Derbyshire
Sturston, Norfolk
Sturston, Suffolk